Byron (Low Tax) Looper (born Byron Anthony Looper; September 15, 1964 – June 26, 2013) was a Democratic turned Republican politician in Tennessee and convicted murderer. In order to advance his political career, he legally changed his middle name from "Anthony" to "(Low Tax)". After being convicted for the October 1998 murder of his election opponent, incumbent Tennessee State Senator Tommy Burks, he was given a life sentence in prison. He died in prison in 2013.

Early life, education and early career 

Byron Looper was born in Cookeville, Tennessee. He spent most of his childhood in Georgia, where his father, Aaron Looper, was a school superintendent.

Looper attended the U.S. Military Academy at West Point from 1983 to 1985, but he was given an honorable discharge following what he said was a serious knee injury. After being discharged, he moved to Georgia, where he attended the University of Georgia and worked for the state legislature after graduation.

In 1988, Looper ran for the Georgia House of Representatives as a Democrat, losing to Wyc Orr in the Democratic primary. He enrolled as a graduate student in the Stetson School of Business and Economics at Mercer University in Atlanta. He continued his political involvement as an officer in the Georgia Young Democrats organization and as a campaign worker in Al Gore's 1988 campaign for the Democratic presidential nomination and the 1992 Clinton-Gore presidential campaign.

Career 
In 1992, Looper returned to Tennessee and became a Republican. He lost a race for the Tennessee House of Representatives in 1994, when he ran against incumbent legislator Jere Hargrove.

In 1996, he legally changed his middle name from Anthony to "Low Tax" and ran successfully for the post of Putnam County Tax Assessor, defeating a 14-year incumbent after a campaign in which he did not make any public appearances nor participate in debates, instead relying heavily on negative campaign ads.

As Tax Assessor, Looper used his office's equipment to send numerous press releases to Tennessee news media, making positive claims about himself and alleging various shortcomings on the part of other local officials. He seldom came to work, and there were many reports of irregularities in property tax assessments. 

In March, 1998, following an investigation by the Tennessee Bureau of Investigation, Looper was indicted on 14 counts of official misconduct, theft of services and official oppression for theft, misuse of county property and misuse of county employees. He claimed the charges were politically motivated due to Democratic control of Putnam County politics and the Tennessee General Assembly. The Cookeville Herald-Citizen newspaper regularly reported the Republican Tax Assessor's bizarre antics and public verbal assaults of Putnam County elected officials. The Tennessee Republican Party soon claimed no connection with Looper.

The ouster suit led to Looper's removal from office in January, 1999.

Looper also faced legal problems from a former girlfriend who sued him for $1.2 million, saying that she became pregnant and bore a child after he raped her and that he had used his official position to steal her house. Earlier he had run campaign ads in which he falsely represented the same girlfriend as his wife.

After Looper's removal from office and conviction for murder, prosecutors decided not to pursue the criminal indictments filed in March 1998.

1998 political candidacies 

In the August 1998 primary, Looper sought the Republican nominations for both the Tennessee's 6th congressional district and the Tennessee State Senate. He failed in his quest for the Congressional House nomination, finishing third in a field of four, but he was unopposed for the state senate nomination. This set up his campaign against incumbent Democratic State Senator Tommy Burks.

Burks had represented Putnam County in the state legislature for 28 years, including four two-year terms in the Tennessee House of Representatives and five four-year terms in the Tennessee State Senate. A farmer and an old-style conservative Southern Democrat, he was popular in his district. He usually won reelection with ease, and the 1998 campaign was expected to be no different.

Assassination of Tommy Burks 

On the morning of October 19, 1998, authorities were called to investigate an apparent murder at the Burks farm. Tommy Burks' body was found with his head resting on the steering wheel of his pickup truck and a single bullet wound above his left eye. Burks had been speaking moments earlier with a farmhand, Wesley Rex, about work that needed to be done on the farm.

Both men had seen a black car drive by the farm on multiple occasions that morning, driven by a man in sunglasses and black gloves. The car had later sped by Rex's truck, allowing Rex to get a view of the driver.

Cumberland County authorities immediately began a standard homicide investigation, but could find no one with any plausible reason to murder Burks. Then Rex called Burks' widow, Charlotte Burks, after seeing a picture of Looper on television, and told her that Looper was the man he had seen speeding away in the black car the morning of the murder.

Looper later turned up in Hot Springs, Arkansas, where he met with a friend, United States Marine Corps recruiter Joe Bond. Bond and Looper had been friends as children, and Looper had rekindled the friendship in the summer of 1998, largely on the basis of wanting Bond's expertise in small arms. Bond would eventually become a key witness for the prosecution in Looper's murder trial. Looper had stayed with Bond for a while, talking a great deal about how he had murdered his Senate opponent and how he needed to, among other things, change the tires on the car he had used in the murder, as well as hide the car. 

Looper was arraigned at a hearing that featured Bond as a surprise witness for the state. During the pre-trial phase, Looper attempted to have his former friend disgraced, and shuffled through at least six lawyers, one of whom filed a sealed court document explaining why, for ethical reasons, he could no longer be Looper's attorney.

Campaign after the murder 

Tennessee state law required that the name of a candidate who died before the election be removed from the ballot, and it did not allow the candidate's party to replace a deceased candidate who died within 30 days of the election. Accordingly, after Burks' death, Looper became the only candidate listed on the official ballot for Burks' senate seat.

Several people tried to have Looper's name stricken from the ballot, claiming that Looper's arrest constituted moral turpitude. The state Republican Party distanced itself from Looper. To prevent Looper from winning the state senate seat on a technicality, Burks' widow, Charlotte was put forth as a write-in candidate for her husband's seat. Dozens of volunteers helped her campaign, including some Republicans. On election day, Charlotte Burks, as a write-in candidate, won the seat with 30,252 votes against Looper's 1,531 votes. One of her first initiatives as state senator was to introduce legislation to ensure that the name of any candidate who dies within 40 days of an election could remain on the ballot, thus preventing the situation that occurred after her husband's death. Charlotte Burks won re-election in 2002, 2006, and 2010. She retired after the 2014 election.

Murder conviction and sentence 

Looper's jury trial for murder finally occurred in 2000 after several delays because he repeatedly changed attorneys, most of whom filed a variety of motions requesting a different judge, as well as change-of-venue. Ultimately, Looper's trial was not moved; jurors were brought in from Sullivan County to reduce the chance that they had been influenced by pre-trial publicity. By the time of the trial, a work crew had found the weapon apparently used in the murder, near the junction of Tennessee State Route 111 and I-40.

Wes Rex and Joe Bond were both prominent witnesses for the prosecution, as were two political consultants who reported having been contacted at various times by Looper, who had told both men that he wanted to run a political race, and felt the surest way to win would be to murder his opponent. Tennessee Bureau of Investigation expert Sandy Evans testified that the tire tracks at the scene came from Looper's Audi. The prosecuting attorney, Tony Craighead, told the jury that Looper had intended to "win this election with a Smith & Wesson." For his defense, Looper tried to rely on testimony from his mother and her neighbors, who said he was visiting his mother's home in Flowery Branch, Georgia, on the morning that Burks died, but witnesses he produced to support his alibi were excluded from testifying because they had not been identified to the court before the trial, as required by Tennessee law.  Despite forensic and eyewitness evidence presented at trial, Looper's mother maintained her son's innocence to his death, and beyond.

In August, 2000, Looper was convicted of first-degree murder and sentenced to life in prison without chance of parole. The victim's family had requested that prosecutors not seek the death penalty. Following his conviction and sentencing, he was transferred to Brushy Mountain State Penitentiary in Petros, Tennessee. When the Brushy Mountain Penitentiary closed in 2009, Looper was moved to the Morgan County Correctional Complex.

In late 2001, Looper sued a TV station and individual station personnel for depicting him unfavorably in a broadcast interview. Meanwhile, Looper was also the subject of "Eliminating the Competition", episode 163 of the TV series American Justice.

He also filed a lawsuit against Tennessee Department of Correction personnel and the contractor that provided medical services in Tennessee prisons, charging that the conditions of his confinement were unconstitutional and that he was not receiving adequate medical care. In that suit he asked for $47 million in damages. He also filed several unsuccessful motions to overturn his conviction.

Death 

Looper was found dead in his prison cell on June 26, 2013. Nearly two hours before Looper was found, a prison incident report shows he assaulted a pregnant female counselor and had to be restrained. An autopsy revealed he had a heart condition caused by a combination of high blood pressure and hardening arteries; he also had a toxic level of anti-depressants in his system.

"Low Tax" name imitators 

Other political candidates and public personalities have emulated Looper's adopted name or have independently adopted similar names. Among these were Something Awful founder Richard "Lowtax" Kyanka, who adopted his nickname as a reference to Byron Looper, for whom Kyanka nearly worked as an intern in the summer of 1997. In 1998, a candidate with the name Craig 'Tax Freeze' Freis ran for the California Board of Equalization. He finished fourth place (out of six candidates running) in the Democratic Primaries for the office. 

In Los Angeles County, a candidate by the name of John "Lower Taxes" Loew has run in every election for county assessor between 2000 and 2018. He explained that he changed his name in order to send a message about his political positions.  In 2000, Loew received less than 1% of the vote in the special election to fill a vacancy in the office. In 2002 and 2006, Loew lost the elections to incumbent Rick Auerbach by a 70%–11% margin in 2002, and by a 77%–23% margin in 2006. Loew ran again in 2010, where he finished in third place with 10.6% of the vote. In 2014 he finished in fourth place with 9.47% of the vote. In 2018 Loew again ran with the name "Lower Taxes" on the ballot and ended up in second place with 23.58%, forcing incumbent Jeffrey Prang into a runoff. Loew lost the runoff to Prang by a margin of a little over 20%.

References

External links 
 
 Mark Gribben, Assassination in Middle Tennessee, Crime Library: Notorious Murderers (Turner Entertainment Networks). Court TV account of the Looper case.

1964 births
2013 deaths
American assassins
American people who died in prison custody
American prisoners sentenced to life imprisonment
Politicians convicted of murder
Prisoners sentenced to life imprisonment by Tennessee
American people convicted of murder
People convicted of murder by Tennessee
People from Cookeville, Tennessee
Prisoners who died in Tennessee detention
Tennessee politicians convicted of crimes
County officials in Tennessee
Georgia (U.S. state) Democrats
Tennessee Republicans
University of Georgia alumni
United States Military Academy alumni